The Melodics were Australian Electro hip hop outfit. They have received national airplay on Triple J and have toured nationally with Jackson Jackson and Phrase.  During rapper tag #40 Jeremedy started that The Melodics were calling it quits and the last show would be at the Hi-Fi Bar in Melbourne 4 November 2011.

Jeremedy has started a solo project under the name of Grey Ghost while Jamie Barlow formed Indie electronic band Private Life

Discography
The Glen Schnieblic EP
Naught n Crosses EP
Live from Nowhere EP
4D (2009) - Remedy Music
Paint Me Gold EP (2010) - Independent
Last Ever Show Live at the Hi Fi - Live Album (Exclusive to concert attendees)

References

Victoria (Australia) musical groups